Mautodontha boraborensis is a species of gastropod in the family Charopidae. It is endemic to French Polynesia.

References

Fauna of French Polynesia
Boraborensis
Gastropods described in 1884
Taxonomy articles created by Polbot